DXAQ-TV, channel 43 (analog) and channel 19 (digital), is the flagship television station of Philippine religious television network Sonshine Media Network International (SMNI). The station owned and operated by Swara Sug Media Corporation. Its studios are located at the Kingdom of Jesus Christ compound, Philippine-Japan Friendship Highway, Sasa, Davao City, while its transmitter is located at Shrine Hills, Matina, Davao City.

Digital television

Digital channels

UHF Channel 19 (503.143 MHz)

Areas of coverage

Primary areas 
 Davao City
 Davao del Sur
 Davao del Norte

Secondary areas 
 Portion of Davao de Oro

See also
DWAQ-DTV
DXRD
Sonshine Media Network International

Sonshine Media Network International
Television channels and stations established in 2003
Television stations in Davao City
Digital television stations in the Philippines